The Brachyceran infraorder Xylophagomorpha is a small group that consists solely of the family Xylophagidae, which presently contains subfamilies that were sometimes considered to be two small related families (Coenomyiidae and Rachiceridae). Other obsolete names for members of this family include Exeretonevridae and Heterostomidae.

The family is known by the English name awl-flies.

The larvae are often predatory, consuming other insect larvae living in rotting wood.

Description
Flies in this family have elongated bodies and resemble ichneumon wasps in shape. The base of the abdomen is constricted. The antennae have three segments.

Genera
These nine genera belong to the family Xylophagidae:
Anacanthaspis Röder, 1889
Arthropeas Loew, 1850
Coenomyia Latreille, 1797
Dialysis Walker in Saunders, 1850
Exeretonevra Macquart, 1846
Heterostomus Bigot, 1857
Odontosabula Matsumura, 1905
Rachicerus Walker, 1854
Xylophagus Meigen, 1803

References

Gallery

 
Brachycera families
Articles containing video clips
Taxa named by Carl Fredrik Fallén

no:Xylophagomorpha